Serjeantson is a surname. Notable people with this surname include:

 Kate Serjeantson (died 1918), Welsh stage actress
 Susan Serjeantson (born 1946), Australian geneticist and professor